The Liberal Moroccan Party is a political party in Morocco.

History and profile
The party was established in March 2002 as a splinter from the Constitutional Union Party by the attorney Mohammed Ziane, former delegate Minister for Human Rights in the Abdellatif Filali government, 1994–1998.

In the parliamentary election held on 27 September 2002, the party won 3 out of 325 seats. In the next parliamentary election, held on 7 September 2007, the party did not win any seats.

References

2002 establishments in Morocco
Liberal parties in Morocco
Political parties established in 2002
Political parties in Morocco